Ipomoea aristolochiifolia is a species of plant in the family Convolvulaceae. It is endemic to parts of South America.

References

 Global compendium of weeds

aristolochiifolia
Flora of South America